Nature One is one of the largest European open air electronic music festivals, featuring many renowned DJs from Germany and all over the world. In significance it is not as big as Mayday nor as old, having started three years later than the Mayday festival. However attendance has surpassed the Mayday, even when one takes into account that the Mayday only lasts one evening, while the Nature One has two main evenings with additional smaller events from Thursday till Sunday.

Overview 

Nature One tickets cost approximately 70 euros (as of 2010). But unlike the Love Parade, the only real damage to nature occurs due to the trampling of the grass on the bunker hills and the fields used for camping (the crops have always been harvested by the time the festival starts).

As a special attraction there is a fireworks display on Saturday evening.

The festival lasts for one long weekend each year always on the first weekend of August.

In 2004 the festival had an attendance of roughly 53,000, with over 40,000 using the nearby fields for camping over the weekend (officially allowed and organized by the Nature One staff).

The camping ground has always been the second festival, with many hobby DJs and some commercially organized trucks, loaded with generators and fuel, the equipment rivaling small clubs in turntables, loudspeakers and sometimes even lighting. Some people who are either unwilling or unable to pay for admission to the festival area use this fact to have a cheaper alternative festival weekend.

The festival itself is structured into four "main floors" each for a few thousand:
Open Air Floor (mostly Trance)
Century Circus (Techno)
House of House (House, Minimal)
Classic Terminal
There are also a few smaller areas (in 2012, there are 18 smaller areas), sometimes occupied by techno club crews for a few hundred.
The whole thing is located at a US missile base called "Pydna", now decommissioned, which has all necessary infrastructure and space for this kind of festival, a total of 100 000 m² (without camping, which takes up more than 1 km²).

Since 2002 Nature One is supported by eve&rave Münster e.V. with drug-information-desks.

Past and future Nature One

Awards 
 Dance Music Award
 2003: in the category "Best Event"
 The Helga Festival Award (from Festivalguide)
 2013: in the category "Best Festival National" (Audience Award)

See also 
List of electronic music festivals

References

External links 

http://www.nature-one.de/events/nature-one/

Techno
Electronic music festivals in Germany
Music festivals established in 1995